Soapsuds, Soapsuds is an album by Ornette Coleman and Charlie Haden recorded in 1977 and released on the Artists House label.

Reception 

The AllMusic review by Scott Yanow stated "This unusual album found Coleman taking time off from his electric free funk group, Prime Time, to record acoustic duets with his longtime associate, bassist Charlie Haden. Coleman switches to tenor and trumpet for the challenging music which includes three of his originals".

In JazzTimes, Duck Baker wrote: "The most significant dividing line in Ornette’s chronology might be Charlie Haden's leaving the group in the mid-'70s. This set of duos from a few years later highlights the telepathy that was crucial to the success of so many classic earlier recordings ... a fine, relaxed set whose very effortlessness might make it seem less than it is, which is of course top-notch".

The authors of the Penguin Guide to Jazz Recordings described Coleman's tenor sax sound on the album as "a light, alto-range tone which irresistably recalls Lester Young, and which sits perfectly alongside Haden's bass." They commented: "This is a unexpectedly lyrical record, the one in the OC canon which will always catch out (figuratively) blindfolded testees... Not considered to be an A-list record, but we're carrying a torch for it."

Track listing
All compositions by Ornette Coleman except where noted
 Side A
 "Mary Hartman, Mary Hartman" (Sanger D. Shafer) – 7:44
 "Human Being" (Charlie Haden) − 7:46 
 "Soap Suds" – 5:12 
 Side B
 "Sex Spy" – 9:55 
 "Some Day" – 7:34

Personnel
Ornette Coleman - Tenor Saxophone, Trumpet
Charlie Haden - Bass

References

1977 albums
Ornette Coleman albums
Charlie Haden albums
Artists House albums
Free jazz albums